Ibrahim Ali Ahmed Haidan (born 1972) is a Yemeni military official who serves as current Interior Minister of the internationally recognized Yemeni government. On 18 December 2020, former President Abdrabbuh Mansour Hadi appointed Maj. Gen. Ibrahim Haidan as the interior minister of the Cabinet of Yemen.

Early life and education 
Ibrahim Haidan was born in 1972 in the city of Mualla in Aden, and received his primary and secondary education there. He entered the Naval College in Hodeidah Governorate and graduated with the rank of lieutenant. He hold many military positions since his graduation until he became senior teacher in the college. Haidan studied Command and Staff course in the Sultanate of Oman, and then moved to the United States of America to receive a qualification course. He obtained a higher fellowship certificate from the Supreme Military Academy in Sana'a.

References 

21st-century Yemeni military personnel
1972 births
21st-century Yemeni politicians
Interior ministers of Yemen
People from Aden
Living people
First Maeen Cabinet
Second Maeen Cabinet